Costume museum may refer to:
 Costume Museum of Canada
 Costume Museum (Kastoria)

Other costume museums:
 Centre National du Costume de Scene, France
 Devonshire Collection of Period Costume, England
 Korea Museum of Modern Costume
 Museum of Ayrshire Country Life and Costume, Scotland
 Museum of the History of the Greek Costume, Greece
 National Museum of Costume, Scotland
 National Museum of Costume and Fashion, Portugal

See also
 Fashion museum
 Textile museums